Madhu Balakrishnan (24 June 1973) is an Indian playback singer who primarily sings in Malayalam. He has also sung songs in Tamil, Telugu, Kannada and Tulu languages. He has sung over 40 songs in films and several devotional albums.

Personal life
 
Madhu Balakrishnan was born on 24 June 1973 to Balakrishnan and Leelavathy at Paravur, Eranakulam. His earlier life was at Koratty ,near Chalakudy, Thrissur. He completed his schooling in Mar Augustine Memorial Higher Secondary School, Koratty. He was inspired by his mother to take up music. Later he shifted to Paravur, his native place. He is married to Divya, elder sister of Indian cricketer S.Sreesanth.

List of songs

Malayalam

Tamil

Kannada

Awards
 2002 - Kerala State Film Award for Best Singer for the song "Amme Amme" from the film Valkannadi
 2006 - Tamil Nadu State Film Award for Best Male Playback Singer
 2007 - Kalaimamani award for excellence in music, dance, cinema and art conferred by the Tamil Nadu state government.
 2017 - Honorary Doctorate from The International Tamil University, USA

References

External links
 
 
 Madhu to perform at Swaralaya Dance & Music Festival-2006
 2005 interview

Living people
Year of birth missing (living people)
Indian male playback singers
Singers from Kochi
Kerala State Film Award winners
Tamil playback singers
Malayalam playback singers
Kannada playback singers
Malayali people
Tamil Nadu State Film Awards winners
Filmfare Awards South winners
Film musicians from Kerala
Telugu playback singers
21st-century Indian singers
21st-century Indian male singers